Guidizzolo is a comune (municipality) in the Province of Mantua in the Italian region Lombardy, located about  east of Milan and about  northwest of Mantua. The bordering municipalities of Guidizzolo are Cavriana, Ceresara, Goito, Medole and Solferino.

Main sights
The most ancient edifice is the Oratory of St. Lawrence, a small Romanesque devotional building dating from the 13th century.

Guidizzolo Tragedy
The road between Cerlongo and Guidizzolo, in the communal territory of Cavriana, was the location of Alfonso de Portago's fatal accident in the 1957 Mille Miglia, where 12 people died. A memorial at the roadside commemorates the event.

The crash killed the driver, the co-driver and ten spectators, including five children. Spinning out of control, the Ferrari hit a channel on the left side of the road, then veered back into the onlookers. Two of the dead children were hit by a concrete highway milestone that was ripped from the ground by the car and thrown into the crowd. The body of Portago was in two sections, and co-driver Edmund Nelson was badly disfigured beneath the upside down vehicle.

Enzo Ferrari was charged with manslaughter in a criminal prosecution that was finally dismissed in 1961.

References

External links

 Official website 

Cities and towns in Lombardy